Richard Goulding (born 1980/1981) is a British actor, best known for playing Prince Harry in the 2014 stage play King Charles III, and its 2017 BBC TV adaptation, as well as in 2016 television series The Windsors.

Education 
Goulding was educated at Shrewsbury School, Oxford University, and the Guildhall School of Music and Drama.

Career 
Goulding is a visiting director at the Guildhall School of Music & Drama, and at which he appeared as Ivor Gurney in A Soldier and a Maker in 2012. His other stage work includes The Seagull (2007–2008) and A Mad World My Masters (2013) for the Royal Shakespeare Company, The Way of the World at the Sheffield Crucible (2012), both runs of Posh (2010 and 2012), the 2012 King Lear at the Almeida Theatre and the 2013 Titus Andronicus and A Mad World My Masters with the Royal Shakespeare Company. Film and television work has included The Iron Lady, Foyle's War and Fresh Meat.

In 2019, he appeared as Boris Johnson in Toby Haynes's Channel 4 production, Brexit: The Uncivil War, and as Daniel Radcliffe in the satirical comedy, Island of Dreams.
In 2021 he played David Boutflour in the Netflix series White House Farm.

Theatre

Filmography

Film

Television

References

External links

1980s births
Living people
Alumni of the Guildhall School of Music and Drama
British male stage actors
British male film actors
British male television actors